Tim Murray (born October 31, 1963) is a Canadian ice hockey executive.

Prior to 2014, Murray served as general manager of the Binghamton Senators of the American Hockey League and assistant general manager of the NHL's Ottawa Senators under his uncle Bryan Murray; he previously held positions as a scout with the Detroit Red Wings, Florida Panthers, Anaheim Ducks and New York Rangers. From 2014 to 2017, Murray was the general manager of the Buffalo Sabres of the National Hockey League (NHL); with a tenure of less than four seasons, he had the shortest tenure of any permanent general manager in Sabres history (Murray's successor, Jason Botterill, would have a slightly shorter tenure and was fired after only three full seasons).

History
 1993–1994: scout for the Detroit Red Wings
 1994–2002: scout for the Florida Panthers
 2002–2005: director of player personnel for the Anaheim Ducks
 2005–2007: scout for the New York Rangers
 2007–2014: general manager for the Binghamton Senators
 2007–2014: assistant general manager for the Ottawa Senators
 2014–2017: general manager for the Rochester Americans
 2014–2017: general manager for the Buffalo Sabres

Personal life
Murray was born in Shawville, Quebec to Barrie Murray, a retired owner of an automotive shop and Sandra Horner Murray, who became mayor of Shawville a few months before Tim became GM of the Buffalo Sabres. Barrie's automotive shop was in the same building as his brother Bill's sporting goods store. While growing up in Shawville, Tim worked for both his dad in the automotive shop and also for his Uncle Bill in the sporting goods store.

He is a nephew of the late general manager, Bryan Murray, and his brother, Terry Murray.

On July 21, 2012, he joined his uncles, Bryan and Terry, as inaugural inductees in Shawville’s Hockey Wall of Fame.

References

External links
Tim Murray's staff profile at Elite Prospects

1963 births
Living people
Anaheim Ducks executives
Binghamton Senators
Buffalo Sabres executives
Canadian ice hockey officials
Detroit Red Wings scouts
Florida Panthers scouts
New York Rangers scouts
Ottawa Senators general managers